Xantholobus is a genus of treehoppers in the family Membracidae. There are about 14 described species in Xantholobus.

Species
These 14 species belong to the genus Xantholobus:

 Xantholobus altus Ball c g
 Xantholobus arenatus Ball c g
 Xantholobus arizonensis Funkhouser c g
 Xantholobus coconinus Ball c g
 Xantholobus hirsutus Ball c g
 Xantholobus inflatus Van Duzee c g
 Xantholobus intermedia Emmons c g
 Xantholobus intermedius b
 Xantholobus lateralis Van Duzee c g b
 Xantholobus mutica Fabricius c g
 Xantholobus muticus b
 Xantholobus nigrocincta Van Duzee c g
 Xantholobus nitidus Van Duzee c g
 Xantholobus tumida Walker c g

Data sources: i = ITIS, c = Catalogue of Life, g = GBIF, b = Bugguide.net

References

Further reading

External links

 

Smiliinae
Auchenorrhyncha genera